Archibald L. Mayo (January 29, 1891 – December 4, 1968) was a film director, screenwriter and actor.

Early years
The son of a tailor, Mayo was born in New York City. After attending the city's public schools, he studied at Columbia University.

Film
Mayo moved to Hollywood in 1915 and began working as a director in 1917. His films include Is Everybody Happy? (1929) with Ted Lewis, Bought! (1931) with Constance Bennett, Night After Night (1932) with Mae West, The Doorway to Hell (1930) with James Cagney and Lew Ayres, Convention City (1933) with Joan Blondell, The Mayor of Hell (1933) with James Cagney, The Petrified Forest (1936) with Bette Davis and Humphrey Bogart, and The Adventures of Marco Polo (1938) with Gary Cooper.

Mayo retired in 1946, shortly after completing A Night in Casablanca with the Marx Brothers and Angel on My Shoulder with Paul Muni, Anne Baxter, and Claude Rains.

Recognition
Mayo has a star at 6301 Hollywood Boulevard in the Motion Pictures section of the Hollywood Walk of Fame. It was dedicated February 8, 1960.

Death
Mayo died of cancer in Guadalajara, Mexico on December 4, 1968. He is interred in the Hollywood Forever Cemetery in Hollywood, California.

Filmography

 All Over Twist (1923)
 Christine of the Big Tops (1926)
 Money Talks (1926)
 Unknown Treasures (1926)
 Johnny Get Your Hair Cut (1927)
 The College Widow (1927)
 Dearie (1927)
 Quarantined Rivals (1927)
 Slightly Used (1927)
 State Street Sadie (1928)
 The Crimson City (1928)
 On Trial (1928)
 My Man (1928)
 Beware of Married Men (1928)
 Sonny Boy (1929)
 Is Everybody Happy? (1929)
 The Sacred Flame (1929)
 Wide Open (1930)
 Courage (1930)
 Oh Sailor Behave (1930)
 The Doorway to Hell (1930)
 Vengeance (1930)
 Illicit (1931)
 Svengali (1931)
 Under Eighteen (1931)
 Bought (1931)
 Night After Night (1932)
 Street of Women (1932)
 Two Against the World (1932)
 The Expert (1932)
 The Life of Jimmy Dolan (1933)
 The Mayor of Hell (1933)
 Ever in My Heart (1933)
 Convention City (1933)
 Gambling Lady (1934)
 The Man with Two Faces (1934)
 Desirable (1934)
 Bordertown (1935)
 Go Into Your Dance (1935)
 The Case of the Lucky Legs (1935)
 The Petrified Forest (1936)
 I Married a Doctor (1936)
 Give Me Your Heart (1936)
 Black Legion (1937)
 It's Love I'm After (1937)
 Call It a Day (1937)
 The Adventures of Marco Polo (1938)
 Youth Takes a Fling (1938)
 They Shall Have Music (1939)
 The House Across the Bay (1940)
 Four Sons (1940)
 The Great American Broadcast (1941)
 Charley's Aunt (1941)
 Confirm or Deny (1941)
 Moontide (1942)
 Orchestra Wives (1942)
 Crash Dive (1943)
 Sweet and Low-Down (1944)
 A Night in Casablanca (1946)
 Angel on My Shoulder (1946)

References

External links 

1891 births
1968 deaths
American male film actors
American male stage actors
Screenwriters from New York (state)
Film directors from New York City
Film producers from New York (state)
Burials at Hollywood Forever Cemetery
Deaths from cancer in Mexico
20th-century American male actors
20th-century American screenwriters